The Old Town is an archaeological site near Al-'Ula, Medina Province, Saudi Arabia. It is known as the deira (the town). Inside the town, there are ancient heritage buildings, mosques and markets, dating back to about seven centuries. This town is 22 km away from Mada'in Saleh. The heritage town looks like a single building due to the crowding of its 870 residential units. These units are separated by narrow and winding alleys. The town is divided into two districts: Al-Shugaig in the north and Al-Haf in the south.

Remaining monuments (archeological sites) 
Mousa Bin Nusayr castle.
Tantora which was a guide for farmers to know the growing seasons and the timing of water distribution. 
The sundial clock in the south of the town.

See also 
 Sarat Mountains
 Winter at Tantora Festival

References 

Archaeological sites in Saudi Arabia
History of the Arabian Peninsula
Medina Province (Saudi Arabia)
Oases of Saudi Arabia